William Warden may refer to

William Warden (printer) (1761–1786), American printer in Boston, Massachusetts
William Warden (Royal Navy officer) (1777–1849), Scottish naval surgeon